Étalon is a commune in the Somme department in Hauts-de-France situated in northern France.

Geography

Places of interest
 Remains of Gallo-Roman villas
 Tomb of a soldier of the Crusades

Population

See also
Communes of the Somme department

References

Communes of Somme (department)